Lowell Lake State Park is a day use state park on 102-acre Lowell Lake in Londonderry, Vermont.

Activities includes hiking, non-motorized boating, fishing, picnicking, wildlife watching, and winter sports.

There is an informal car top boat launch but no restroom or other facilities.

The Lowell Lake Trail is a loop approximately 3.5 miles in length, which encircles the lake.  Along the trail is a Revolutionary War-era cemetery.

References

External links
Official website

State parks of Vermont
Protected areas of Windham County, Vermont
Londonderry, Vermont
1981 establishments in Vermont
Protected areas established in 1981